"Overcomer" is the lead single, released on June 21, 2013, from Mandisa's fourth album, Overcomer.

Composition
"Overcomer" is originally in the key of G Minor, with a tempo of 120 beats per minute. Written in common time, Mandisa's vocal range spans from G3 to F5 during the song.

Commercial performance
Overcomer reached No. 1 on the Billboard Hot Christian Songs chart, and No. 3 on their Bubbling Under Hot 100 chart, spending a total of nine weeks on the latter chart. It also stayed No. 1 on the National Christian Audience chart for 12 weeks, as well as No. 1 for 14 weeks on SoundScan's Christian/Gospel Core Digital sales chart.

The song was certified Gold by the RIAA on November 13, 2014, and achieved Platinum certification on January 23, 2020.

Music video
The music video's world premiere was aired on Good Morning America on September 5, 2013. The music video for the song premiered on September 12, 2013 on VEVO. Furthermore, the video has over forty million views on YouTube. Featured in the video are Gabby Giffords, Mark Kelly, Robin Roberts, Scott Hamilton, and Hannah Curlee.

Live performances
Mandisa performed the song on television for the first time on Good Morning America.

Use in media
The song was used as the title song for the Good Morning America series "Overcomers", in which host Robin Roberts asked viewers to share their personal stories to the world. It was also featured on WOW Hits 2014 in 2013 and in the motion picture of the same name in 2019.

Accolades 
The song won a Grammy award in 2014 for Best Contemporary Christian Music Song for its songwriters David Garcia, Ben Glover and Christopher Stevens.

Charts

Weekly charts

Year-end charts

Decade-end charts

Certifications

References 

2013 singles
2013 songs
Mandisa songs
Songs written by Ben Glover
Sparrow Records singles
Songs written by Christopher Stevens (musician)
Songs written by David Garcia (musician)